Bebida Beverage Company is a company which manufactures Koma Unwind, a carbonated, berry flavored relaxation drink with melatonin, milk thistle, rose hips and valerian root as ingredients.

Products
Koma Unwind is made in several varieties: Regular, Sugar Free, Zero, and Shots. Regular and Sugar Free come in 12 oz cans, and contain valerian root, rose hips, and melatonin. Zero contains a combination of valerian root, milk thistle, rose hips, B-12, chamomile, L-theanine and passion flower. In addition to Koma Unwinde, the company also makes Potencia Energy (drinks and shots), Relax 5 shots, and Piranha Water.

On June 6, 2013, Bloomberg Businessweek reported that Koma Unwind was one of the six biggest sellers in the relaxation beverage industry.

In March 2015 the Food and Drug Administration issued a Warning Letter to Bebida over labeling and inclusion of the neurohormone melatonin. Melatonin can be included in supplements, but is not approved as a food additive, and is therefore considered an adulterant. The FDA contends that Koma is described as a supplement, but is sold and marketed as a beverage. As of August 13, 2015, the FDA has put a halt to selling Koma Unwind until the company fixes its labeling.

Marketing

United States

Koma Unwind advertises in such sports such as NASCAR, Hydroplane racing, and competitive fishing.

Stock car racing
In October 2009 Koma Unwind sponsored NASCAR Driver Steve Park in Camping World Truck race at Talladega, Alabama.

In 2011, Koma Unwind sponsored the Frank Stoddard-owned team for the Pure Michigan 400 at Michigan International Speedway with driver Ken Schrader. The company has also sponsored driver Jennifer Jo Cobb.

On February 19, 2013, Koma Unwind sponsored former two-time NASCAR Sprint Cup Series champion Terry Labonte at the helm for the Daytona 500. The event was the first time the product has backed Labonte.

The company is the sponsor of Koma Unwind Modified Madness Series, which began in 2014.

Hydroplane Racing
Koma Unwind was the primary sponsor of Shameless Racing, a Hydroplane racing team, for the 2013 American Canadian Hydroplane Association season.

Pro Angler
Koma Unwind sponsored competitive fisher David Cooke for five events in 2013.

References

External links
 

Drink companies of the United States
Companies based in North Carolina
Companies traded over-the-counter in the United States
Relaxation drinks
Food and drink companies based in North Carolina